The Libyan resistance movement was the rebel force opposing the Italian Empire during its Pacification of Libya between 1923 and 1932.

History

First years

The Libyan resistance, associated with the Senussi Order, was initially led by Omar Mukhtar (Arabic عمر المختار ‘Umar Al-Mukhtār, 1862–1931), who was from the tribe of Mnifa. The First Italo-Senussi War had two main active phases: the Italo-Turkish War (1911–12), when Italy invaded Libya, and the Senussi Campaign (1915–17), part of World War I, in which Italian and British forces fought the Ottoman and German-supported Senussi. The Libyans were eventually defeated. After a period of relative peace, the Second Italo-Senussi War broke out in 1923 and lasted until 1932.

Second Italo-Libyan War (1923–1932)

Later King Idris and his Senussi tribe in the provinces of Cyrenaica and Tripolitania started to become opposed to the Italian colonization after 1929, when Italy changed its political promises of moderate "protectorate" to the Senussi (done in 1911) and—because of Benito Mussolini—started to take complete colonial control of Libya.

Resistance was crushed by General Rodolfo Graziani in the 1930s and the country was again controlled by the Italians with the help of Arab fascists, to the point that many Libyan colonial troops fought on the side of Italy between 1940 and 1943: two divisions of Libyan colonial troops were created in the late 1930s and 30,000 native Libyans fought for Italy during World War II.

See also
 Gasr Bu Hadi
 Fourth Shore
 Italia irredenta 
 Italian Mare Nostrum
 Resistance during World War II

References

Muslim rebellions
Arab rebellions
Interwar period
Italian Libya
Italy–Libya relations
Libyan nationalism
Military history of Libya
National liberation movements
Rebellions against empires
African resistance to colonialism